The karate competition at the World Games 2017 took place from 25 to 26 July, in Wrocław in Poland, in the GEM Sports Complex. 96 sportsmen from 39 nations participated in the event.

Schedule 
All times are in Central European Summer Time (UTC+02:00).

Tuesday, 25 July 2017
10:00–15:00 Men's Kata, Kumite 60 kg, Kumite 67 kg, Women's Kata, Kumite 50 kg, Kumite 55 kg preliminaries and semifinals
17:00–19:00 Men's Kata, Kumite 60 kg, Kumite 67 kg, Women's Kata, Kumite 50 kg, Kumite 55 kg medal competitions

Wednesday, 26 July 2017
10:00–15:00 Men's Kumite 75 kg, Kumite 84 kg, Kumite +84 kg, Women's Kumite 61 kg, Kumite 68 kg, Kumite +68 kg preliminaries and semifinals
17:00–19:00 Men's Kumite 75 kg, Kumite 84 kg, Kumite +84 kg, Women's Kumite 61 kg, Kumite 68 kg, Kumite +68 kg medal competitions

Participating nations

 Algeria (4)
 Argentina (1)
 Australia (4)
 Austria (2)
 Azerbaijan (2)
 Brazil (4)
 Chile (1)
 China (1)
 Chinese Taipei (1)
 Croatia (1)
 Denmark (1)
 Dominican Republic (2)
 Egypt (5)
 Fiji (1)
 France (10)
 Georgia (1)
 Germany (2)
 Great Britain (1)
 Greece (1)
 Hungary (1)
 Iran (5)
 Italy (2)
 Japan (7)
 Kazakhstan (2)
 Montenegro (1)
 Morocco (1)
 Netherlands (1)
 New Zealand (2)
 Peru (2)
 Poland (11)
 Saudi Arabia (1)
 Senegal (1)
 Slovakia (2)
 Spain (3)
 Switzerland (1)
 Turkey (2)
 Ukraine (3)
 United States (3)
 Venezuela (2)

Medalists

Kata

Men's kumite

Women's kumite

Medals table

References

External links
 Results book (Archived version)

 
2017 World Games
2017
World Games